Cysticapnos is a genus of flowering plants belonging to the family Papaveraceae.

Its native range is Southern Africa.

Species:

Cysticapnos cracca 
Cysticapnos pruinosa 
Cysticapnos vesicaria

References

Papaveraceae
Papaveraceae genera